Troullos, also known as Trullos, is the archaeological site of an ancient Minoan settlement on Crete.  The Troullos site is the easternmost section of the ancient settlement at Archanes.  The king of Knossos is believed to have maintained a summer palace there.

Archaeology
Trullos was first excavated by Sir Arthur Evans, later by Spyridon Marinatos and most recently by J. and E. Sakellarakis.  The site was in use from Middle Minoan II until late Minoan I.

Architecture
 Paved courtyards
 Middle Minoan II, Middle Minoan III and Late Minoan I multiple-storeyed buildings
 Late Minoan I house, including a light-well
 Clay-brick partition walls (building internals)
 Ashlar walls (building internals)
 Wall-paintings on plaster

Artifacts
Among the movable artifacts at Troullos:
 Polychrome Kamares ware
 Terracotta figurines
 Tripod offering tables
 Beak-spouted jugs
 The Archanes Ladle, a translucent alabaster ladle with Linear A inscriptions labelled TLZa1 by Godart and Olivier - discovered by Evans and believed to be from within Middle Minoan III-Late Minoan IA (A stunning photograph of this piece is available in Sakellarakis' guidebook to Archanes)
 Marble pestles
 Ritual steatite axe
 Stone bird's nest vases
 Porphyrite conical rhyton
 Two bull's head rhytons

References

Further reading
 Sakellarakis, J. and E. 1991 Crete Archanes  (guidebook)

Heraklion (regional unit)
Minoan sites in Crete
Populated places in ancient Greece
Former populated places in Greece
Knossos